The New South Wales Waratahs ( or ;), referred to as the Waratahs, are an Australian professional rugby union team representing the majority of New South Wales in the Super Rugby competition. The Riverina and other southern parts of the state, are represented by the Brumbies, who are based in Canberra, Australian Capital Territory (ACT).

The Waratahs play their home games at the new Allianz Stadium in Sydney.

History

Amateur era 

The NSWRU (or then, The Southern RU – SRU) was established in 1874, and the very first club competition took place that year. By 1880 the SRU had over 100 clubs in its governance in the metropolitan area. In 1882 the first New South Wales team was selected to play Queensland in a two-match series. NSW would go on to win both the games. That same year the first NSW touring squad was selected to go and play in New Zealand.

In 1907, several of the New South Wales rugby union team's players defected. They included the "superstar", Dally Messenger. These players joined the New South Wales rugby league team against a visiting rebel New Zealand rugby team. This was essentially the birth of rugby league in Australia.

During World War I, the NSW (and QLD) Rugby Unions ceased senior competition. The Queensland body however would not reform until 1929, which saw NSW have more responsibilities for Australian rugby. In 1921 the Waratahs toured New Zealand again, and out of their 10 fixtures, won nine games, including the Test.

The most famous Waratah team was the 1927/28 Waratahs who toured the United Kingdom, France and North America, introducing a style of open, running rugby never seen before, but which has been the stamp of the Australian game ever since. They won 24 and drew two of their 31 official matches. Seven members of this 1927/8 side were from the Drummoyne Rugby Club. Upon returning home, were greeted with a parade through Sydney and a reception at Town Hall. Matches against Queensland would soon resume also.

The 1930s were a particularly successful time for NSW. The height of the success of NSW is best represented by the defeat of the South African Springboks in 1937 at the SCG. NSW Rugby Union would also perform strongly throughout the following decades as well, which included the emergence of footballers such as Trevor Allan, David Brockhoff, Tony Miller, Nick Shehadie, Eddie Stapleton, Ken Catchpole, John Thornett, Peter Crittle and Ron Graham.

In 1963, the Sydney Rugby Union was established for the growth of the game in the city area. The NSW Rugby Union would celebrate its 100th anniversary in 1974. As part of the anniversary celebrations, a match was played at the SCG on 18 May against the All Blacks, though the Waratahs lost nil to 20.

Professional era

Super 12: 1996–2005 

In their inaugural Super 12 season of 1996, the Waratahs won just under half of their games, finishing mid table, with the two other Australian teams finishing above them. The following season of 1997 saw the Waratahs end in a 9th place, winning four fixtures.

In the 1998 season the Waratahs won a best six out of 11 games, ending up in 6th position on the ladder at the end of the season, despite obvious improvements the team had still yet to make a finals appearance. The Waratahs won four fixtures the next season. They won five games in the 2000 season and the 'Tahs finished their season in 9th place.

In 2001 after replicating their 2000 performance, the Waratahs were still out of reach of finals contention, in 8th position. 2002 was a record breaking season for the Waratahs, as the team won eight out of their 11-season games and finished in second place behind the Crusaders – making the semis. However, in the final game of the regular season the Waratahs lost 96–19 (a Super Rugby record). They were defeated by their Australian rivals the Brumbies, 51–10, in the Waratahs' first ever semi-final. The combined score over the two weeks was Brumbies/Crusaders 147 v. Waratahs 29.

In the 2003 season the Waratahs missed a place in the finals, finishing in 6th position on the ladder at the end of the regular season. In 2004 the Waratahs made a promising start to their season with three straight wins. The team finished 8th on the Super 12 table, six points out of the finals. That year coach Ewen McKenzie re-introduced the end of season tour, taking place in Argentina that year. In 2005, they had their best regular season, finishing second in the table, before losing to the Crusaders in the 2005 Super 12 Final.

Super 14: 2006–2010 
The Waratahs finished 3rd on the regular season table for the 2006 Super 14 season, in which two new teams entered the expanding tournament, the Force and Cheetahs. In the last home match of the regular season, the Waratahs hosted the Hurricanes, which they lost 14 to 29. The news that star league recruit Wendell Sailor had tested positive to an illegal substance and thus faced a career ending ban from the game was an unwelcome intrusion on the Waratahs semifinal build up. The following week, the semi-finals, they again faced the Hurricanes, though away in Wellington. The Waratahs made their exit, losing 16 to 14. Wendell Sailor later received a two-year ban from the game, marring a season that had promised so much.

The 2007 Super 14 season was the most disappointing for the team and its supporters with the Waratahs winning only three games, against the lions, the wooden spoon winning Reds, and the Hurricanes in the final round gaining a final placing of 13th out of 14. Despite the poor performance the 2007 season saw the emergence of teenage rugby prodigy Kurtley Beale and proved to be a vital rebuilding stage in the Waratahs super 14 championship run.

The 2008 season began well for the NSW Waratahs, with solid pre-season wins and a solid opening game victory against the Hurricanes 20–3. After starting the season in a slow but solid manner the 'Tahs began to play their best rugby in their mid season match with the Blues, scoring their first four try bonus point of the season. The Waratahs then continued on a roll finishing their home season with another impressive 4 try bonus point win against title front runners the Sharks, advancing to second place on the ladder. The Waratahs faced the Reds in the final round with a win securing second place, combined with a home semi-final win over the Sharks, moved them up to their first Super 14 final against the Crusaders, which they later lost 12–20.

In the last two seasons of the Super14 format, the Waratahs failed to make the final on both occasions after narrowly missing the finals (on points difference) in 2009 and qualifying for the semi-final in 2010.

Super Rugby: 2011–present 

In the 2011 season, the Waratahs again failed to reach the final. The following two seasons were very bleak by comparison. Coach Chris Hickey parted ways with the club at the end of the season with Michael Foley taking over the reins for 2012. The Waratahs finished well outside finals contention in 2012 in 11th place. This brought about another change in the coaching department with Michael Cheika for 2013. His impact was not immediate as the Waratahs failed to make the finals for a second consecutive season finishing 9th overall.

Championship season 2014 

The 2014 season of the super rugby competition was undoubtedly the Waratahs greatest season so far. The Waratahs not only overcame the Curse of the Tahs, a commonly held superstition, but they were also able to post the greatest super rugby season yet. The second season under coach Michael Cheika saw a new expansive style of rugby implemented which gave birth to exciting running rugby, bringing dwindling crowds back in force with home games averaging at around 19,152 people in attendance .

The running intent of Michael Cheika was quickly revealed after the team saw two fly halves announced in the starting game against Western Force. The Waratahs opening match not only saw Kurtley Beale's return, scoring one try and having a hand in several others, but it was also a showcase to reveal the Tahs new weapon; Israel Folau. Folau highlighted Cheika's intent scoring a hat-trick of tries in what was soon to be a season of all-out attack by the Waratahs. Not only did the Waratahs score the most points in the opening match out of any team with a 43–21 score, but they also had the second largest winning margin of 22 points.

The Waratahs went on to win the Australian conference with 13 more points than the team that came in at second place, the Brumbies, and came in as the number one team 7 points ahead of the competition. The Waratahs were in the driver's seat advancing straight through to the semi-finals; the club's 8th semi-final appearance. After the Brumbies defeated the Chiefs 32–30, the Brumbies advanced to compete against the Waratahs. The Waratahs displayed a show of force in their performance against an in-form Brumbies team, decimating them 26-8 granting the Waratahs a home final. The final, held at Stadium Australia, was host to 61,823 spectators. With two tries a piece, six penalties each, and the Crusaders up 32–30, only one conversion made the difference. The turning point in the game was a penalty at the 79th minute by the famous New Zealand flanker, Richie McCaw 45 metres out. Bernard Foley's penalty 45m out right in front of the post gave the Waratahs' a lead 33–32. The Waratahs had finally won a Super Rugby Championship.

Logo and colours

The "Waratahs" name has historically been the name for the New South Wales Rugby Union (NSWRU) representative team, and became the name for the New South Wales team when it entered the Super Six, Super 10 and Super 12 competitions. The name and emblem comes from the waratah, the state flower for New South Wales.

The New South Wales Waratahs commonly play in a Cambridge Blue jersey and navy blue shorts, blue having a long sporting association with the state and a famous rivalry with the red/maroon colour of Queensland. Longtime sponsors HSBC feature on the front of the jersey. The Waratahs wore the HSBC logo for the final time when they played Argentina in August 2013.

The 2014 season saw Volvo as the Waratahs new major sponsor, after a number of years being minor sponsors with 'sleeve presence' on the previous jersey. An alternative white strip is also used. In pre-season of 2006, the Waratahs donned a New Jersey scheme in a trial game against the Crusaders. This system saw traditional rugby playing numbers on the back of jerseys replaced with the initials of the player. The current jersey is made by ISC and is Cambridge blue with navy side panels, collar and cuffs, with the alternate strip being white with five Cambridge blue hoops, collar and cuffs.

Until 1885, New South Wales wore 'heather green' strips. From 1891 to 1897, New South Wales played in scarlet jerseys. The following season, the team adopted Cambridge blue jerseys. The light blue jersey and navy blue pants were established in 1897 and have been in effect ever since.

Sponsorship
In Super Rugby the Waratahs have featured the following sponsors:

Stadium
 
 
Until 2019, the Waratahs played at Sydney Football Stadium (SFS) in Sydney's Moore Park. The capacity for the stadium was 45,500. The Waratahs shared the ground with Sydney FC and the Sydney Roosters.

In 2009, the Waratahs signed a multimillion-dollar deal with Stadium Australia which saw them play at least one game per season at the Sydney Olympic Park stadium until 2015.

As well as the SFS, the Waratahs have on occasion played fixtures at other stadiums throughout the state. During the Australian Provincial Championship, in which the Waratahs had two fixtures, the games were taken to the Central Coast Stadium in Gosford, and the other to Bathurst. The Waratahs also played trial matches at Campbelltown Stadium in 2008 and 2015.  During the 2018 Super Rugby season, the Waratahs played one home game at Brookvale Oval and one at the Sydney Cricket Ground.

With the SFS closed for demolition and rebuilding as the Sydney Football Stadium (2022) from 2019 to 2022 home games are split between the new CommBank Stadium, the Sydney Cricket Ground, Brookvale Oval and even outside of Sydney at Hunter Stadium in Newcastle.

Team song 
At the end of every winning game, the Waratahs sing the following song:
"We are the mighty Waratahs 
Rough and tumble rugby stars 
We play the game as it should be played

Famous when we run the ball 
We can scrum and ruck and maul 
Playing the game as it should be played

Waratahs, Waratahs 
We play the game as it should be played 
Famous when we run the ball 
We can scrum and ruck and maul 
Playing the game as it should be played

We are the mighty men in blue 
We will take the game to you 
We play the game as it should be played

We’ve got talent 
We’ve got heart 
We will tear your team apart 
Playing the game as it should be played

Waratahs, Waratahs 
We play the game as it should be played 
We’ve got talent 
We’ve got heart 
We will tear your team apart 
Playing the game as it should be played"
—Waratahs website, Team song

Development teams
The New South Wales Waratahs own and manages two National Rugby Championship teams, the Sydney Rays and NSW Country Eagles. These NRC teams draw on a range of players ranging from full-time professionals to those on incentive contracts. These teams are closely aligned with the Waratahs and are based at Moore Park, the training venue used by the Waratahs.

Outside of the NRC season, many of these players are retained in the Gen Blue (NSW A) team, which is the Waratahs elite development squad just below full-time professional level. The Sydney Rays and NSW Country Eagles also field Under 19 teams.

Gen Blue (NSW A)
The Gen Blue team plays matches against interstate and international representative teams, and has also competed in tournaments such as the Pacific Rugby Cup. Known by various names over the years including NSW A, Waratahs A, Gen Blue, and Junior Waratahs, the team is selected from the best emerging rugby talent in New South Wales. The squad is composed of Waratahs contracted players, extended training squad members, New South Wales Under 19s, and selected Shute Shield club players.

Under 19
Two New South Wales teams, Sydney Rays U19 and NSW Country Eagles U19, play in the national URC competition. Prior to 2008, state colts teams at under 21 and under 19 age levels were fielded in national tournaments and competitions such as the Trans-Tasman Trophy. These colts teams were consolidated as under 20s ahead of the inaugural World Rugby U20 Championship. In 2018, an under 19 age limit was reinstated for the national colts team competition.

Season standings
{| class="wikitable"
|- border=1 cellpadding=5 cellspacing=0
! style="width:20px;"| Season
! style="width:40px;"|Pos
! style="width:30px;"|Pld
! style="width:25px;"|W
! style="width:25px;"|D
! style="width:25px;"|L
! style="width:35px;"|Bye
! style="width:40px;"|F
! style="width:40px;"|A
! style="width:35px;"|+/-
! style="width:25px;"|BP
! style="width:35px;"|Pts
! style="width:200px;"|Finals results
|- align=center
|align=left|1996
|align=left|6th
|11||5||0||6||NA||312||290||+22||8||28||
|- align=center
|align=left|1997
|align=left|9th
|11||4||0||7||NA||255||296||−41||4||20||
|- align=center
|align=left|1998
|align=left|6th
|11||6||1||4||NA||306||276||+30||4||30||
|- align=center
|align=left|1999
|align=left|8th
|11||4||1||6||NA||246||248||−2||6||24||
|- align=center
|align=left|2000
|align=left|9th
|11||5||0||6||NA||273||258||+15||5||25||
|- align=center
|align=left|2001
|align=left|8th
|11||5||0||6||NA||306||302||+4||5||25||
|- align=center
|align=left|2002
|align=left|2nd
|11||8||0||3||NA||337||284||+53||7||39||Lost Semi-final to 
|- align=center
|align=left|2003
|align=left|5th
|11||6||0||5||NA||313||344||−31||7||31||
|- align=center
|align=left|2004
|align=left|8th
|11||5||0||6||NA||342||274||+68||7||27||
|- align=center
|align=left|2005
|align=left|2nd
|11||9||0||2||NA||322||174||148||5||41||Lost Final to 
|- align=center
|align=left|2006
|align=left|3rd
|13||9||0||4||NA||362||192||170||9||45||Lost Semi-final to 
|- align=center
|align=left|2007
|align=left|13th
|13||3||1||9||NA||266||317||−51||7||21||
|- align=center
|align=left|2008
|align=left|2nd
|13||9||1||3||NA||255||186||+69||5||43||Lost Final to 
|- align=center
|align=left|2009
|align=left|5th
|13||9||0||4||NA||241||212||+29||5||41||
|- align=center
|align=left|2010
|align=left|3rd
|13||9||0||4||NA||385||288||+97||7||43||Lost Semi-final to  
|- align=center
|align=left|2011
|align=left|5th
|16||10||0||6||2||407||339||+68||9||57||Lost Qualifying-final to  
|- align=center
|align=left|2012
|align=left|11th
|16||4||0||12||2||346||407||−61||11||35||
|- align=center
|align=left|2013
|align=left|9th
|16||8||0||8||2||411||371||+40||5||45||
|- align=center
|align=left|2014
|align=left|1st
|16||12||0||4||NA||481||272||+209||10||58||Defeated  in Final
|- align=center
|align=left|2015
|align=left|3rd
|16||11||0||5||NA||409||313||+96||8||52||Lost Semi-final to 
|- align=center
|align=left|2016
|align=left|10th
|15||8||0||7||NA||413||317||+96||8||40||
|- align=center
|align=left|2017
|align=left|16th
|15||4||0||11||NA||396||522||–126||8||19||
|- align=center
|align=left|2018
|align=left|3rd
|16||9||1||6||NA||557||445||+112||6||44||Lost Semi-final to 
|- align=center
|align=left|2019
|align=left|12th
|16||6||0||10||NA||367||415||−48||6||30||
|}
Note: Byes (worth 4 points) were added to the competition between 2011 and 2013

Current squad

The squad for the 2023 Super Rugby Pacific season is:

Players and awards

 John Ballesty
 Al Baxter
 Matt Burke
 David Campese
 Brendan Cannon
 Ken Catchpole
 Tony Daly
 Sydney Deane
 Rocky Elsom
 Nick Farr-Jones
 Phil Kearns
 Simon Poidevin
 Ray Price
 Mat Rogers
 Wendell Sailor
 Morgan Turinui
 Lote Tuqiri
 Phil Waugh
 Chris Whitaker

Award winners
The Matthew Burke Cup is awarded to the best Waratahs player at the end of each season:

 2004 – Phil Waugh  
 2005 – Nathan Grey
 2006 – Adam Freier
 2007 – Rocky Elsom
 2008 – Wycliff Palu
 2009 – Wycliff Palu 
 2010 – Tatafu Polota-Nau
 2011 – Kurtley Beale
 2012 – Dave Dennis
 2013 – Michael Hooper
 2014 – Michael Hooper 
 2015 – Michael Hooper 
 2016 – Michael Hooper 
 2017 – Michael Hooper 
 2018 – Israel Folau 
 2019 – Michael Hooper  
 2020 – Michael Hooper

Coaches
(As of 2023 season second round; 4 March 2023)

All head coaches of the New South Wales Waratahs since the Super Rugby era (1980s), listed by order of the first game in charge of the team are:

Honours

Professional era
 Super 12/14 (1996–2010):
 Runners-up (2): 2005, 2008
 Play-off Appearances (3): 2002, 2006, 2010
 Super Rugby (2011–present): / Super Rugby AU (2020–2021): / Super Rugby Trans-Tasman (2021):
 Champions: 2014
 Australian Conference Champions (3): 2014, 2015, 2018
 Play-off Appearances (4): 2011, 2014, 2015, 2018

Statistics
Statistics in this section include only those pertaining to Super Rugby matches (1996–present). They do not include any matches prior to this period (1882–1995). Records for "in a season" include finals games unless otherwise stated.
Correct as of 26 November 2014.

Team
Biggest winning margin: 62 v Southern Kings, Nelson Mandela Bay Stadium, 2013.
Biggest win: 72–10 v Southern Kings, Nelson Mandela Bay Stadium, 2013.
Biggest loss: 19–96 v Crusaders, Lancaster Park, 2002.
Highest team score: 77 v , Sydney Football Stadium, 2018.
Most regular season wins: 12, in 2014.
Most consecutive wins in a season: 9, in 2014.
Most consecutive defeats in a season: 8, in 2012.
Most tries in a season: 81, in 2018.
Most conversions in a season: 68, in 2018 – Bernard Foley.
Most penalty goals in a season: 50, in 2014.
Most drop-goals in a season: 3, in 2014.
Most points in a season: 613, in 2018.
Most tries scored in a match: 12 v Sunwolves, Sydney Football Stadium, 2018.
Most conversions in a match: 9 v , Sydney Football Stadium, 2010.
Most penalty goals in a match: 7 v , Sydney Football Stadium, 2001 – v , Stadium Australia, 2014.
Most drop-goals in a match: 1 on 12 occasions

Individual
Most caps: 151, Benn Robinson. Kurtley Beale
Most caps as captain: 56, Phil Waugh.
Most wins as captain: 35, Phil Waugh.
Most points: 1,172, Matt Burke, (1996–2004).
Most tries: 58, Israel Folau (2013–present).
Most conversions: 160, Matt Burke (1996–2004).
Most penalty goals: 173, Matt Burke (1996–2004).
Most drop-goals: 3, Kurtley Beale (2007–present) and Berrick Barnes (2010–2013).
Most points in a season: 252, Bernard Foley, in 2014.
Most tries in a season: 15, Taqele Naiyaravoro, in 2018.
Most conversions in a season: 68, Bernard Foley, in 2018.
Most penalty goals in a season: 44, Bernard Foley, in 2014.
Most drop-goals in a season: 3, Berrick Barnes, in 2010.
Most points in a match: 34 (3t; 2c, 5p), Peter Hewat, v , Sydney Football Stadium, 2005.
Most tries in match: 4, Drew Mitchell, v , Sydney Football Stadium, 2010.
Most conversions in match: 9, Berrick Barnes v , Sydney Football Stadium, 2010.
Most penalty goals in a match: 7, Matt Burke v  in 2001 and Bernard Foley v  in 2014.
Most drop-goals in a match: 1, (on 12 occasions – Kurtley Beale & Berrick Barnes on 3 occasions – and 6 others players on 1 occasion each).

See also

Dan Vickerman Cup
National Rugby Championship

Notes

References

External links
 

 NSW Rugby website

 
War
Rugby clubs established in 1882
Rugby union teams in Sydney
Super Rugby teams
1882 establishments in Australia
Super Rugby champions